SpeedOf.Me is an internet speed test service which uses pure browser capabilities such as HTML5 and JavaScript to test the internet speed of the user. SpeedOf.Me utilizes multiple servers around the world, with the server used being chosen automatically based on location.

References

External links
SpeedOf.Me for Desktop
SpeedOf.Me for Mobile

Internet technology companies of the United States
Internet properties established in 2011
Network performance
Computer network analysis